Carlos Alós Ferrer (born 21 July 1975) is a Spanish football manager, currently in charge of the Rwanda national football team.

Career

Playing career
Alós was born in Tortosa, Tarragona, Catalonia, and started his career with his hometown club CD Tortosa in 1993. A goalkeeper, he never appeared in any higher than Tercera División during his playing days, representing CF La Sénia, Deportivo Alavés B, CD Don Benito, Tortosa, CF Amposta, UE Remolins-Bítem, CD Roquetenc and CF Jesús Catalonia, retiring with the latter in 2008 at the age of 33.

Managerial career
Alós started his managerial career in 2003, with CF Amposta's youth categories. In 2005 he was named player-manager at Roquetenc, achieving promotion from Primera Regional in his second season.

In 2008, Alós was appointed manager of another club he represented as a player, Tortosa, but resigned on 11 February of the following year and immediately joined the club's board. In January 2010, he moved abroad for the first time in his career, joining Hong Kong Premier League side Kitchee SC as Josep Gombau's assistant.

Alós left Hong Kong in 2011 and joined FC Barcelona's academy in Warsaw, Poland. On 16 January 2015, he took over Pogon Siedlce in the same country, but left the club in May.

In August 2015, Alós moved to Kazakhstan, helping the national team in their project of development of youth football before being appointed manager of the under-17s in January 2017. On 26 July of that year, he was announced as the new manager of FC Kairat, agreeing a deal until the end of the season.

On 28 November 2017, Alós extended his contract with Kairat for another two years. He left by mutual consent the following 15 October.

On 20 January 2019, Alós was appointed FAR Rabat manager. He left by mutual accord on 10 June, only a month after signing a two-year extension, with the team from the capital city having finished 13th.

On 14 June 2019, Qatar SC signed Alós on a two-year deal. He was replaced by Wesam Rizik during the first half of the season, due to poor form.

Alós was hired by Enosis Neon Paralimni FC of the Cypriot First Division in September 2020, starting at a team with no points from four games.

In March 2022, Alós was appointed manager of Rwanda.

Manager statistics

Honours

Manager
Kairat
Kazakhstan Cup: 2017

References

External links

1975 births
Living people
People from Tortosa
Sportspeople from the Province of Tarragona
Spanish footballers
Footballers from Catalonia
Association football goalkeepers
Tercera División players
Deportivo Alavés B players
Spanish football managers
MKP Pogoń Siedlce managers
FC Kairat managers
Qatar SC managers
AS FAR (football) managers
Qatar Stars League managers
Enosis Neon Paralimni FC managers
Rwanda national football team managers
Cypriot First Division managers
Spanish expatriate football managers
Spanish expatriate sportspeople in Hong Kong
Spanish expatriate sportspeople in Poland
Spanish expatriate sportspeople in Kazakhstan
Spanish expatriate sportspeople in Morocco
Spanish expatriate sportspeople in Qatar
Spanish expatriate sportspeople in Cyprus
Expatriate football managers in Hong Kong
Expatriate football managers in Poland
Expatriate football managers in Kazakhstan
Expatriate football managers in Morocco
Expatriate football managers in Qatar
Expatriate football managers in Cyprus
Expatriate football managers in Rwanda
FC Barcelona non-playing staff
Association football coaches